This is a list of broadcast television stations serving cities in the Canadian province of Newfoundland and Labrador.

See also
 List of television stations in Canada
 Lists of television stations in Atlantic Canada
 Media in Canada

References

Newfoundland and Labrador

Television stations